= Rajbala v. State of Haryana =

- Court: Supreme Court of India
- Full case name: Rajbala and Ors. v. State of Haryana and Ors.
- Decided: 10 December 2015
- Citation: Writ Petition (Civil) No. 671 of 2015; (2016) 1 SCC 463 AIR 2016 SC 33

Court membership
- Judges sitting: J.Chelameswar & Abhay Manohar Sapre

Case opinions
- The Haryana Panchayati Raj (Amendment) Act, 2015 was challenged under Article 14 of the Constitution of India. The Supreme Court of India dismissed the challenge and upheld the constitutionality of the Act.
- Decision by: J.Chelameswar
- Concurrence: Abhay Manohar Sapre

Rajbala v. State of Haryana (2016) 1 SCC 463 is a judgment of the Supreme Court of India

The Supreme Court of India upheld educational qualifications for contesting panchayat elections in the state of Haryana.
